Lake Ferry is a small coastal settlement in Palliser Bay, on the southern coast of the North Island of New Zealand. The coast is a popular fishing location and the settlement is a mixture of permanent and holiday homes. There is a historic hotel close to the sea coast where Lake Ōnoke flows into Palliser Bay. The name of the settlement and the hotel arises from a ferry service that previously operated across the lake outlet.

The ferry service was established following a drowning in 1850. The ferry operator established the Lake Ferry hotel in 1851 to supplement his income.

The ocean outlet of Lake Ōnoke is frequently closed by natural wave action on the beach, and this can lead to rising water levels in the lake.  Natural forces can lead to the opening of the lake outlet, but historically, the lake levels have been controlled by excavating a channel through the beach to the sea, to limit flooding of properties around the lake.

The outlet of Lake Ōnoke is known as a dangerous location for fishing, and there have been several drownings.

In July 2020, the wastewater system serving the settlement was damaged during forestry operations, and residents were required to restrict wastewater for two days.  The system uses discharge to a field.  No discharge to waterways was reported. The estimated cost of repairs was $327,000.

Gallery

References

External links

 Lake Ferry Hotel website

South Wairarapa District
Populated places in the Wellington Region